Sabaria FC was a Hungarian association football club from the town of Szombathely, Hungary.

History
Sabaria FC debuted in the 1926–27 season of the Hungarian League and finished third.

Name Changes 
1912-1912: Szombathelyi Acél
1912–1913: Szombathelyi Iparosok Kereskedők és Munkások TK
1913–1926: Szombathelyi Athletikai Klub
1926–1929: Sabaria Labdarúgók Szövetkezete
1929–1932: Sabaria Football Club
1932–1945: Szombathelyi FC
1945–1946: Barátság Szombathelyi AK
1946–1949: Szombathelyi AK
1949: merger with Szombathelyi Bőrgyár and Szombathelyi Textil

References

External links
 Profil

Football clubs in Hungary
1912 establishments in Hungary